Schizopyge is a genus of cyprinid freshwater fish found in Pakistan and the northwestern part of India. Schizopyge is closely related to Schizothorax and some species have historically been moved between the two genera.

Species
There are currently two recognized species in this genus:

 Schizopyge dainellii (Vinciguerra, 1916)
 Schizopyge niger (Heckel, 1838) (Alghad snowtrout)

References 

 
Cyprinid fish of Asia
Cyprinidae genera